VvS1 is an expedition-style luxury motor yacht, commissioned by New Zealand entrepreneur Michael Hill.

The name refers to a near-flawless grade of diamonds.

Designed by Gregory C. Marshall Naval Architect Ltd and constructed by Alloy Yachts, the yacht was launched in 2007.

The VvS1 has won several awards, including Best Motoryacht Under 40 Metres at the World Superyacht Awards in Venice, Italy in April 2008. In September 2008, the yacht won three awards at the World Yacht Awards in Cannes, France for Best Design Under 40 Metres, Best Interior Under 40 Metres and Best Functionality Under 40 Metres.

It currently operates as a charter yacht in the South Pacific.

References

External links
 VvS1 Yacht Charters
 Profile of the VvS1 at Superyacht Times

Motor yachts
2007 ships